Rapi or RAPI may refer to:

 Råpi, a mountain in Sweden
 Rapi Films, an Indonesian film production company
 Remote Application Programming Interface, a mechanism in the Pocket PC

People
 Luigi Rapi (born 1902), Italian automobile designer
 Nina Rapi, Greek-born playwright

See also
 RPi or Raspberry Pi, a series of small single-board computers
 Leuconostoc rapi a bacterium
 Rapi:t, an express train service in Japan